The 1990–91 Liga Alef season saw Maccabi Herzliya (champions of the North Division) and Sektzia Nes Tziona (champions of the South Division) win their regional divisions and promotion to Liga Artzit. 

At the bottom, Beitar Nahariya, Maccabi Hadera (from the North division), Hapoel Lod and Maccabi Shikun HaMizrah (from the South division) relegated to Liga Bet.

North Division

South Division

Hapoel Kiryat Malakhi had 2 points deducted.

Promotion/relegation play-offs
The two second-placed clubs (Hapoel Acre and Hakoah Ramat Gan) played off to face the 14th-placed club from Liga Artzit (Hapoel Bat Yam). Hakoah Ramat Gan won both matches and were promoted, whilst Bat Yam were relegated to Liga Alef.

First round

Second round

References
Alef and Bet Leagues, 1986-87 – 1993-94  Eran R, Israblog 

Liga Alef seasons
Israel
3